Lieutenant General Sir Arthur Arnhold Bullick Dowler,  (16 July 1895 – 14 November 1963) was a senior British Army officer who served as General Officer Commanding East Africa Command from 1948 to 1951.

Military career
Educated at Tonbridge School and the Royal Military College, Sandhurst, Dowler was commissioned as a second lieutenant into the East Surrey Regiment in 1914. He served in the First World War with the 2nd Battalion, East Surreys in France and Belgium. He attended the Staff College, Camberley from 1931 to 1932, alongside Brian Horrocks, Sidney Kirkman, Cameron Nicholson and Thomas Rees, and later returned there as an instructor from 1937 until 1939.

Dowler also saw active service in the Second World War, initially in 1939 as commanding officer of the 1st Battalion, East Surrey Regiment and then as a General Staff Officer with the 49th (West Riding) Infantry Division. In 1940 he was promoted to brigadier and served on the General Staff of V Corps and, promoted on 1 October 1940 to colonel, subsequently commanded the 2nd Infantry Brigade. He was involved in the Narvik expedition in 1940, part of the Norwegian Campaign. In 1942 he was made General Officer Commanding (GOC) of the 38th (Welsh) Infantry Division and then Major-General in charge of Administration of Southern Command. He was put in charge of Administration for the Mediterranean Expeditionary Force in 1944.

After the war Dowler was appointed chief of staff of the British Army of the Rhine, before becoming Director of Infantry at the War Office in 1947. He was GOC East Africa Command from 1948 to 1951 and subsequently Colonel of the East Surrey Regiment until his resignation in 1954. In May 1958 he became Deputy Lieutenant of Surrey.

References

Bibliography

External links
Generals of World War II

 

|-

 

|-

 

1895 births
1963 deaths
Knights Commander of the Order of the Bath
Knights Commander of the Order of the British Empire
East Surrey Regiment officers
People educated at Tonbridge School
Graduates of the Royal Military College, Sandhurst
British Army personnel of World War I
British Army generals of World War II
Graduates of the Staff College, Camberley
Deputy Lieutenants of Surrey
People from New York City
Military personnel from New York City
British Army lieutenant generals
Academics of the Staff College, Camberley
British expatriates in the United States